Under the Amalfi Sun is a 2022 Italian comedy-drama film directed by Martina Pastori, written by Caterina Salvadori and Enrico Vanzina and starring Lorenzo Zurzolo, Ludovica Martino and Isabella Ferrari. 

The film is a sequel to the 2020 film ''Under the Riccione Sun.

Cast

Release
The film was released on Netflix on 13 July 2022.

References

External links
 
 

2020 films
2020s Italian-language films
2020 comedy-drama films
Italian comedy-drama films
Italian-language Netflix original films